S55 (also known as S0–102) is a star that is located very close to the centre of the Milky Way, near the radio source Sagittarius A*, orbiting it with an orbital period of 12.8 years. Until 2019, when the star S62 became the new record holder, it was the star with the shortest known period orbiting the black hole at the centre of the Milky Way. This beat the record of 16 years previously set by S2. The star was identified by a University of California, Los Angeles team headed by Andrea M. Ghez. At its periapsis, its speed reaches 1.7% of the speed of light. At that point it is 246 astronomical units (34 light hours, 36.7 billion km) from the centre, while the black hole radius is only a small fraction of that size (the Schwarzschild radius is about ). It passed that point in 2009 and will be there again in 2022.

Its position in the sky has been monitored from 2000 to 2012 using the W. M. Keck telescope and from 2002 to 2016 with the VLT. One complete orbit has been observed. From Earth's current perspective, it travels in a clockwise direction. Having observed two stars orbiting through complete periods around the centre (S55 and S2), the gravitational potential of SgrA* could be established. It is also possible that there is a great deal of dark matter around the orbits of these stars. Also general relativistic effects due to gravitational redshift should become observable.

References

External links

 Includes position measurements and images.

Sagittarius (constellation)